The 2018 Consumers Energy 400 is a Monster Energy NASCAR Cup Series race held on August 12, 2018 at Michigan International Speedway in Brooklyn, Michigan. Contested over 200 laps on the  D-shaped oval, it is the 23rd race of the 2018 Monster Energy NASCAR Cup Series season.

Report

Background

The track is used primarily for NASCAR events. It is sometimes known as a "sister track" to Texas World Speedway, and was used as the basis of Auto Club Speedway. The track is owned by International Speedway Corporation (ISC). Michigan International Speedway is recognized as one of motorsports' premier facilities because of its wide racing surface and high banking (by open-wheel standards; the 18-degree banking is modest by stock car standards).

Entry list

First practice

Qualifying

Qualifying results

Reed Sorenson practiced and qualified the No. 15 for Ross Chastain who was in Ohio for the Xfinity Series race.

Practice (post-qualifying)

Second practice

Final practice

Race

Stage Results

Stage 1
Laps: 60

Stage 2
Laps: 60

Final Stage Results

Stage 3
Laps: 80

Race statistics
 Lead changes: 9 among different drivers
 Cautions/Laps: 8 for 37
 Red flags: 0
 Time of race: 2 hours, 50 minutes and 51 seconds
 Average speed:

Media

Television
NBC Sports covered the race on the television side. Rick Allen, Jeff Burton, Steve Letarte and two-time Michigan winner, Dale Earnhardt Jr. had the call in the booth for the race. Dave Burns, Marty Snider and Kelli Stavast reported from pit lane during the race.

Radio
Motor Racing Network had the radio call for the race, which was simulcast on Sirius XM NASCAR Radio.

Standings after the race

Drivers' Championship standings

Manufacturers' Championship standings

Note: Only the first 16 positions are included for the driver standings.
. – Driver has clinched a position in the Monster Energy NASCAR Cup Series playoffs.

References

Consumers Energy 400
Consumers Energy 400
Consumers Energy 400
NASCAR races at Michigan International Speedway